Attractiepark Toverland is an amusement park located in Sevenum, the Netherlands. It first opened in 2001 as an indoor family entertainment center, operated by the Gelissen Group. In recent years, Toverland has grown into a fully-fledged theme park, winning the European Star Award for the Best Theme Park in 2018. More recently, the park has shifted towards the adult demographic, partially rebranding and adding new attractions. A name change was also considered in 2018.

Themed areas 
Toverland is divided into six themed areas, of which two are situated indoors.

Land van Toos 
The Land van Toos is the original indoor area of the park. Notable attractions include the Vekoma Junior Coaster "Toos-Express", crossing through the building. The theme area is characterized by the many children's rides and playgrounds.

Wunder Wald 
Wunder Wald is an indoor area located in the same building as the Land van Toos with a ski-theme. The area contains playgrounds, a beer garden and two major attractions, a powered toboggan named "Maximus' Blitz Bahn" and Expedition Zork, a log flume. Between 2015 and 2018 Wunder Wald has been rebuilt as a theme area about alpine countries. Before that, Wunder Wald was called Magic Forest and hasn't any decoration. The ride Maximus' Blitz Bahn was the first ride in the theme park with a background story and a themed queue.

Ithaka 
Ithaka is the original outdoor section of the park, themed to the Ancient Greeks. Ithaka contains three major rides including Troy, a wooden coaster built by Great Coasters International. The area was originally simply named "Troy-Area" in reference to the largest attraction in the area. The area features a replica of the Trojan Horse.

Magische Vallei 
The Magical Valley is themed to a fantasy land populated by 'Dwervels'. Major attractions in the area includes rollercoasters Dwervelwind and Booster Bike, a rapid river attraction, and several restaurants.

Port Laguna 
Opened in 2018, Port Laguna is the new entrance area of the park. The area is circle-shaped and features a Mediterranean theme. The area features brightly colored buildings containing shops, drink and food stores, a game gallery and an interactive show. Port Laguna contains no rides. The area was inspired by the entrance of Disney's Animal Kingdom and the theme area Port Entry of Universal's Islands of Adventure, with some notable differences, such as a curved main street.

Avalon 
Avalon is the newest area in the park, opened in 2018. Based on Celtic mythology, the area includes the Bolliger & Mabillard-built wing coaster Fēnix.

Rides

Water rides

Roller Coasters

Other Attractions

Visitors

References

External links

 

Amusement parks in the Netherlands
2001 establishments in the Netherlands
Buildings and structures in Limburg (Netherlands)
Tourist attractions in Limburg (Netherlands)
Horst aan de Maas
Amusement parks opened in 2001
21st-century architecture in the Netherlands